This is a list of players who played at least one game for the San Diego Mariners of the World Hockey Association from 1974–75 to 1976–77.



A
Ray Adduono,

B
Jamie Bateman,
Bob Blanchet,
Ken Block,
Gregg Boddy,
Dean Boylan,
Brian Bradley,
Gary Bredin,
Don Burgess,
Brian Bye,

C
Tony Cassolato,
Norm Cournoyer,

D
Kevin Devine,
Bob Dobek,

F
Bob Falkenberg,
Norm Ferguson,
John French,

G
Russ Gillow,
Bill Goldthorpe,

H
Jocelyn Hardy,
Jim Hargreaves,
Larry Hornung,
Harry Howell,
Brent Hughes,

I
Lee Inglis,

J
Gary Jacquith,
Joe Junkin,

K
Reg Krezanski,

L
Andre Lacroix,
Rick Lalonde,
Mike Laughton,
Randy Legge,
Ken Lockett,

M
Mike McMahon,
Peter McNamee,
Brian Morenz,
Kevin Morrison,

N
Joe Noris,

O
Tim O'Connell,

P
Gene Peacosh,
Brian Perry,
Gerry Pinder,
Ron Plumb,

R
Craig Reichmuth,
Brad Rhiness,
Wayne Rivers,
Michel Rouleau,

S
Ted Scharf,
Rick Sentes,
Paul Shmyr,

T
Alex Tidey,
Tom Trevelyan,

V
Gary Veneruzzo,
Doug Volmar,

W
Ernie Wakely,
Bob Wall,
Dave Walter,
Bob Winograd,

References
San Diego Mariners (WHA) all-time player roster at hockeydb.com

  
San Diego Mariners
San Diego Mariners players
San Diego Mariners players